Axel Tyll (born 23 July 1953 in Magdeburg) is a German former footballer.

Club career 
Tyll played for 1. FC Magdeburg between 1971 and 1982, winning three East German titles, four cups, and the UEFA Cup Winners' Cup in 1974. He scored 32 goals in 233 East German top-flight matches.

He represented East Germany four times with the full nation team. Tyll was also part of the bronze medal-winning squad of the Olympic team at the 1972 Olympics in Munich but wasn't used on the pitch. Later he played six matches for this selection.

Honors
UEFA Cup Winners' Cup: 1
Winner 1974
DDR-Oberliga: 3
Winner 1972, 1974, 1975
Runner-up 1977, 1978
FDGB-Pokal: 4
Winner 1973, 1978, 1979
Olympic Football Tournament
Bronze medal 1972

References

External links
 
 
 
 
 

1953 births
Living people
Sportspeople from Magdeburg
German footballers
East German footballers
East Germany international footballers
Olympic footballers of East Germany
Olympic bronze medalists for East Germany
1. FC Magdeburg players
Association football midfielders
Medalists at the 1972 Summer Olympics
Footballers from Saxony-Anhalt
Footballers at the 1972 Summer Olympics
People from Bezirk Magdeburg
DDR-Oberliga players